The 45th Kerala Film Critics Association Awards, honouring the best Malayalam films released in 2021, were announced in October 2022.

Winners

Main Awards 
Best Film: Aavasavyuham (Krishand)
Best Actor: Dulquer Salmaan - Kurup, Salute
Best Actress: Durga Krishna - Udal
Best Director: Martin Prakkat - NayattuSecond Best Film: Minnal Murali (Basil Joseph)
Second Best Actor: Unni Mukundan - MeppadiyanSecond Best Actress: Manju Pillai - HomeBest Screenplay: Jeethu Joseph - Drishyam 2Best Music Director: Hesham Abdul Wahab - Hridayam, MadhuramBest Lyricist: Jayakumar K Pavithran - Ente MazhaBest Male Playback Singer: Sooraj Santhosh - "Ganame" from MadhuramBest Female Playback Singer: Aparna Rajeev - "Thira Thodum" from ThuruthuBest Cinematographer: Aslam K Purayil - SaluteBest Film Editor: Prejish Prakash - HomeBest Art Director: Manu Jagadh (Minnal Murali)
Best Makeup Artist: Benoy Kollam (Thuruthu)
Best Costume Designer: Arun Manohar (Sabash Chandra Bose)
Best Popular Film: Hridayam (Vineeth Sreenivasan)
Best Debut Directors: Sanu John Varghese (Aarkkariyam), Varghese Lal (Iru), Benoy Veloor (Moscow Kavala), K. S. Hariharan (Kaalachekon), Sujith Lal (Randu)

 Sepcial Jury Awards 
 Special Jury Award for Direction: V. C. Abhilash (Sabash Chandra Bose)
 Special Jury Award for Film: Chalachitram (Directed by Abdul Gafoor)
 Special Jury Award for Presentation of Anti-Drug Theme: College Cuties (Directed by A. K. B. Kumar)
 Special Jury Award for Production: Shanta Murali (Sara's), Mathew Mambra (Cheraathukal)
 Special Jury Award for Acting: Bheeman Raghu (Kaalachekon), Priyanka Nair (Aa Mukham), Kalabhavan Rahman (Randu), Vishnu Unnikrishnan (Randu, Red River), Shruti Ramachandran (Madhuram), Ratheesh Ravi (Dharani), Anoop Khalid (Six Hours)
 Special Jury Award for Lyrics: Lekha B. Kumar (College Cuties)
 Special Jury Award for Female Playback Singer: P. K. Medini (Thee)
 Special Jury Award for Cinematography: Unni Madavoor (Holy Wound)
 Special Jury Award for Presentation of Diverse Subjects: Dharani (Directed by Srivallabhan), Holy Wound (Directed by Ashok R Nath) and Aa Mukham'' (Directed by Abhilash Purushothaman)

Honourary Awards 
 Chalachitra Ratnam Award: Joshiy
 Ruby Jubilee Award: Suresh Gopi
 Chalachitra Prathibha Award: Revathi, Urvashi, Babu Namboothiri, Kochu Preman

References

External links
 "List of recipients of the Kerala Film Critics Association Awards" (in Malayalam)
 "Kerala Film Critics Association Awards 2021: Official press release" (in Malayalam)

2021 Indian film awards
2021